Ock Soo Park (born June 2, 1944) is an evangelist based in Gangnam, Seoul, South Korea. He founded the Good News Mission, a Christian based new religious movement also known as Guwonpa. He has also founded other organizations, including the Gracias Choir and Orchestra and the International Youth Fellowship (IYF). According to the IYF, he has met with 29 state heads from 23 countries to discuss issues to do with education.

Early life 
Park was a student at Seonsan Middle School where he met a missionary from WEC International in England, and was recruited as a missionary student. He joined the missionary school established by WEC International in 1962.

Ministry career 
As a minister, Park has founded several organizations.

The Good News Mission was founded in 1972 as a missionary school. The organization runs a number of churches throughout South Korea, and sends missionaries abroad. A fraud/scam case against Park and the Good News Mission ended in an acquittal by Korea's Supreme Court; the charge was that Park had sold stock fraudulently to church members and "raked in unlawful profits", but the Supreme Court held that "it is hard to regard Park as an accomplice".The two lower courts also earlier made a verdict that found Park not guilty.

In 2000, Park founded the Gracias Choir, an orchestra and choral ensemble which travels with Park on his international tours. The choir has won various prizes in choir festivals, including the 2015 Marktoberdorf Choral Competition in Germany.

The International Youth Fellowship (IYF) is a Christian-based NGO which Park established in 2001. It has branches in a number of countries, and also operates the "Good News Corps" for college students.

Park has travelled and delivered sermons internationally. In 2016 he was invited to preach a sermon at the "King's Prayer Meeting" in Swaziland (now Eswatini), which was broadcast by the national radio station.

Books 
Park has published a number of books, through his publishing house Good News Publishing, or using self-publishing companies such as Kindle Direct Publishing and Tate Publishing & Enterprises. Titles include

 The Secret of Forgiveness of Sin and Being Born Again (1997), 
 Out from despair (2004), 
 Repentance and Faith (2005), 
 Cain and Abel: The Secret of Forgiveness of Sin and Being Born Again (2005), 
 Notes on Genesis 1 (2008), 
 Notes on Genesis 2 (2008), 
 Navigating the Heart: Who Is Dragging You (2013), 
 Standing on the field of the heart (2018), 
 How I Became Free from Sin (2018), 
 Lectures on Offerings of Leviticus - A Four-Book Set (2019), 
 It Is God That Justifieth (2020),

References

1944 births
Living people